Katlenburg-Lindau (Eastphalian: Katelnborg-Lindau) is a municipality in the Landkreis (district) of Northeim in Lower Saxony, Germany. It is situated approximately 10 km southeast of Northeim, and 20 km northeast of Göttingen. Katlenburg-Lindau was formed on 1 March 1974 from the formerly independent communities of Katlenburg-Duhm, Gillersheim, Berka, Elvershausen, Wachenhausen, Suterode and Lindau. With the exception of Lindau, which had belonged Landkreis Duderstadt (itself formerly part of the Eichsfeld), these communities were part of Landkreis Northeim. 
The Max Planck Institute for Solar System Research (Max-Planck-Institut für Sonnensystemforschung) of the Max Planck Society was located in Lindau from 1946 to 2014, when it was moved to Göttingen. Until June 2004 the MPI was known as "Max-Planck-Institut für Aeronomie".

Localities

Berka
Elvershausen
Gillersheim
Katlenburg
Lindau
Suterode
Wachenhausen

Politics

Municipal council 
CDU 9 Seats
SPD 10 Seats

FW 1 Seat

Schools in Katlenburg-Lindau
Burgbergschule (Katlenburg)
Haupt- und Realschule (Lindau)

Visitor attractions

Katlenburg: the castle after which the township of Katlenburg is named
Mushaus in Lindau
Mordmühle: an old mill in Lindau

Churches
St. Johannis Church
Church of the Cross (Kreuzkirche, Lutheran, Lindau)
St Peter and Paul's Church (Catholic, Lindau)
Church of the Sacred Heart (Herz-Jesu, former catholic, Desecration in 2009, Katlenburg)

Notable figures
August Beuermann (born 14 December 1867 in Elvershausen; died 15 October 1930 in Hannover), German politician (DVP), MdR, MdL (Preußen)
Wilfried Gleitze (born 8 September 1944 in Lindau), lawyer, first director of the Deutschen Rentenversicherung Westfalen (1987-2009), former vice-president of the Bundesversicherungsamt
Michael Krieter (born 21 August 1963 in Northeim), former handball player
 Franz Mueller-Darß (born 29 April 1890 in Lindau; died 18 June 1976  in Lenggries, Upper Bavaria), Forstmeister and Standartenführer of the Waffen-SS
 Rolf Herrmann, former handball player

Sister cities
  Binau, Germany

References

External links
 Katlenburg-Lindau website
 Katlenburg website
 Max Planck Institute for Solar System Research

Northeim (district)